James Franklin Pankovits (born August 6, 1955 in Pennington Gap, Virginia) is an American professional baseball coach, a former Major League Baseball infielder and minor league manager. In MLB, he appeared in 318 games played, 316 of them with the Houston Astros. Pankovits was a manager in the minor leagues for 17 years, most recently in 2019 with the Lynchburg Hillcats, the High-A affiliate of the Cleveland Indians.

Professional career
The ,  Pankovits was selected by the Astros in the fourth round of the 1976 Major League Baseball Draft from the University of South Carolina. During his six-year Major League career (1984–88; 1990), Pankovits was used primarily as a pinch hitter and occasional second baseman. In one instance, he even caught an inning of a  game . In his career, he hit .250 with nine home runs and 55 RBI.

Late in his playing career, Pankovits appeared in two games for the Boston Red Sox in September  as defensive replacement—without logging a plate appearance—then began his managing career in the Red Sox' farm system in 1992. He returned to the Astro organization in 1995, serving through 2010 as a minor league manager at the Class A, Short Season-A and Double-A levels, and as a roving infield instructor.  He then joined the Mariners' system in 2011 as manager of the Double-A Jackson, Tennessee, Generals of the Southern League. Coincidentally, he had managed a different franchise with the same name—the Jackson, Mississippi, Generals of the Double-A Texas League—in 1998–99 when it was an Astro affiliate.

His career record as a minor-league manager is 938–1,010 (.482). As the  manager of Mahoning Valley of the Short-season New York–Penn League, he is a member of the Cleveland Indians' organization.

Youth and college baseball
Pankovits played in 1968 Little League World Series for the Tuckahoe Little League team from Richmond, Virginia, that was U.S. national champions and the LLWS runner-up.  He also was a member of runner-up South Carolina Gamecocks during the 1975 College World Series

PANKOVITS—The System
In 2007, the Astros introduced a player analysis formula in his honor. The brain child of then-general manager Tim Purpura, PANKOVITS is an acronym for Player Analysis with Neutral Knowledge of Offensively Vital Information Tracking Statistics. It is credited in some circles with predicting the success of Hunter Pence and the failure of Woody Williams during the 2007 season.

References

External links
, or Retrosheet
2001 interview with Jim Pankovits 

1955 births
Living people
Albuquerque Dukes players
Baseball players from Virginia
Boston Red Sox players
Buffalo Bisons (minor league) players
Charleston Charlies players
Cocoa Astros players
Columbus Astros players
Covington Astros players
Hawaii Islanders players
Houston Astros players
Major League Baseball infielders
Major League Baseball outfielders
Minor league baseball managers
Pawtucket Red Sox players
People from Pennington Gap, Virginia
San Bernardino Pride players
South Carolina Gamecocks baseball players
Tigres de Aragua players
American expatriate baseball players in Venezuela
Tucson Toros players
University of South Carolina alumni
Minor league baseball coaches